Ramanagara district, is one of the 31 districts of Karnataka state in southern India. Ramanagara City is the administrative headquarters of this district. The district is part of Bengaluru Division.

History
Ramanagara district was carved out of the erstwhile Bengaluru Rural district on 23 August 2007, comprising Ramanagara, Channapatna, Harohalli, Kanakapura and Magadi taluks.

Geography
Ramanagara is approximately 50 km southwest of Bengaluru. The district shares borders with the districts of Bangalore Urban in the east, Bangalore Rural in the North-east, Tumkur in the North-west, Mandya in the west and Chamarajanagar in the south-west and Krishnagiri district of Tamilnadu state in the south. It has an average elevation of 747 metres (2450 feet).
Ramanagara is famous for the huge rocky outcroppings. The popular places for rock climbing are; Savandurga which is 31km away from Ramanagara, Ramadevarabetta located within the city, Sri Revana Siddeshwara (SRS) betta which is 15.1km away from Ramanagara, Thenginkalbetta near to SRS betta and Kabbaladurga which is 35km away from Ramanagara.
This region has several tall granitic hills which are famous for many short rock climbs, typically 1 to 2 pitches in length. Grades vary from 5.8 American to 5.11 American. It is home to some of the world's oldest granite outcrops. Some of the interesting climbs are on the Wanakkal wall ("Gabbar ki asli pasand", "Labor pain"), on the Rainbow wall ("UIAA", "Kalia"), on Anna-Thamma ("Darkness at dawn", "Black Diamond", the name Anna-Thama means 'elder-brother-younger-brother' in Kannada).

Another well-known hill is Ramadevarabetta. Along with Savandurga this was one of the shooting locations for David Lean's A Passage to India. Small door like grottoes was made in the rock to resemble caves.  It was also in this region that the path-breaking Hindi movie, Sholay, was shot.

Other famous hills in the region include the Revanasideshwara hill and Handigundi. Bilikal Rangaswamy Betta is a popular tourist spot in the district.

These hills have been threatened by quarrying and also plans to carve these hills into statues. The region is covered in scrub forest and is home to threatened bird species such as the yellow-throated bulbul and long-billed vultures. The hill is today one of the few locations in south India where long-billed vultures nest. The region is also home to numerous sloth bears.

Closepet granites

The Closepet granites are a major geological feature of this region and are from the Lower Proterozoic era. This belt of rocks extends in the north-south direction in 50  km belt. This belt has younger potassic granites and is believed to separate two distinct crustal blocks of Archaean age. The block to the west has low-grade granite-greenstone belts with iron-manganese ores and to the east are younger gneiss of granitic and granodioritic composition with gold-bearing schist belts.

Demographics
According to the 2011 census Ramanagara district has a population of 1,082,636, roughly equal to the nation of Cyprus or the US state of Rhode Island. This gives it a ranking of 421st in India (out of a total of 640). Its population growth rate over the decade 2001-2011 was 5.06%. Ramanagara has a sex ratio of 976 females for every 1000 males, and a literacy rate of 69.2%. Scheduled Castes and Scheduled Tribes make up 18.83% and 2.12% of the population respectively.

At the time of the 2011 census, 83.49% of the population spoke Kannada, 10.51% Urdu, 2.21% Telugu, 1.32% Lambadi and 1.08% Tamil as their first language.

Villages
 

Megalapalya

Economy
Ramanagara is famous for its silk market, one of the biggest in Asia, giving it the other name of Silk City, It is also called as Cosmopolitan Cocoon Market because of the people from different states participates in cocoon transaction here. On an average, 35 Metric tons of cocoons are being transacted daily in this market. 
In Ramanagara, there are 600 cottage basins (improved), 85 multi-end reeling units and 04 Automatic Reeling Unit of 400 Ends capacities. There are also about 95 Twisting units functioning at this place.
Ramanagara district includes the Bidadi Industrial Area and Harohalli Industrial Area the first Industrial Areas in the state,  which houses the manufacturing units of Toyota, Coca-Cola, and a 1400 MW combined cycle gas-based power plant.

References

External links

 Official website

 
Districts of Karnataka
2007 establishments in Karnataka